The chancellor of the Duchy of Lancaster is, in modern times, a sinecure office in the government of the United Kingdom.

Oliver Dowden has been chancellor of the Duchy of Lancaster since 25 October 2022.

Chancellors of the Duchy of Lancaster (1361–1644)

Chancellors serving Parliament and the Commonwealth

Chancellors of the Duchy of Lancaster (1660–present)

17th century

18th century

19th–21st centuries

Notes

References

Bibliography
 
 
 

Lists of government ministers of the United Kingdom
 
Ministerial offices in the United Kingdom
Executive ministers
Ceremonial officers in the United Kingdom
Lists of office-holders in the United Kingdom
Lists of office-holders in England